Marija Tolj (born 29 November 1999) is a Croatian athlete specialising in the discus throw. She won a gold medal at the 2019 European U23 Championships.

Her personal best in the event is 64.71 metres set in Oran in 2022.

International competitions

References

1999 births
Living people
Croatian female discus throwers
People from Orebić
World Athletics Championships athletes for Croatia
Athletes (track and field) at the 2020 Summer Olympics
Olympic athletes of Croatia
Athletes (track and field) at the 2022 Mediterranean Games
Mediterranean Games competitors for Croatia
20th-century Croatian women
21st-century Croatian women
Mediterranean Games gold medalists in athletics
Mediterranean Games gold medalists for Croatia